Lothian Buses Ltd are a major bus company operating in Edinburgh.

A number of the vehicles used by Lothian Buses and its predecessors have been preserved. Several of them appear at rallies and events with some travelling around the country. The following is a list of the vehicles now preserved:

See also
 Transport in Scotland

References

External links
 Lothian Buses Official Website
 Lothian Bus Consortium
 Edinburgh Trams Official Website (Launch 2014)
 Lothian Buses Category in the website of The Scotsman newspaper.
 Scotland Buses - Lothian's Buses enthusiast's picture website
 Line-up image of all the major branded Lothian double-deckers as of Feb 2008

Transport in West Lothian
Transport in Edinburgh
Transport in East Lothian
Transport in Midlothian
Bus-related lists